"Deus Ex Machina" is the 19th episode of the first season of the American drama television series Lost. The episode was directed by Robert Mandel and written by executive producers Carlton Cuse and Damon Lindelof. It first aired on ABC in the United States on March 30, 2005.

The character of John Locke (Terry O'Quinn) is featured in the episode's flashbacks, revealing how he discovered who his parents were, only to realize in the end that they conned him for selfish reasons. In the present, John is having a personal crisis due to his and Boone's (Ian Somerhalder) inability to open the hatch they unearthed. Meanwhile, Jack Shephard (Matthew Fox) reveals to Sawyer (Josh Holloway) that the latter has hyperopia, or far-sightedness.

"Deus Ex Machina" was seen by an estimated 17.75 million American household viewers.

Plot

Flashbacks
A non-paraplegic John Locke (Terry O'Quinn) meets a mysterious woman (Swoosie Kurtz) in the discount superstore in which he works. After an initial meeting, Locke later notices the same woman watching him in the store's parking lot. He chases after her to confront her and she explains that she is his birth mother, Emily Locke. Locke asks about his father and Emily claims that Locke doesn't have a father because he was immaculately conceived. Undeterred, Locke hires a private investigator who finds Locke's father, Anthony Cooper (Kevin Tighe).

When Locke visits his father's affluent home he is welcomed with open arms. Locke forms a strong relationship with his father, who now frequently takes him hunting. One day Locke arrives at the home early and discovers his father receiving dialysis treatment. Eventually Locke offers one of his kidneys to save his father. After the surgery, Locke wakes up in the hospital to find that his father has discharged himself home for private care and abandoned him. Emily arrives to explain that when Anthony realized he needed a kidney, he tracked down their son and paid her to make contact with him, presumably for the sole purpose of getting the transplant. Devastated, Locke pulls himself out of the hospital bed and drives to his father's home, but is regretfully turned away by the gate guard, with whom he has become friendly. As he drives away, Locke breaks down over the betrayal.

On the Island
It is Day 39, October 30, 2004, on the island, Locke and Boone Carlyle (Ian Somerhalder) build a trebuchet in an effort to break open the hatch window. When this fails, an exasperated Locke pounds the hatch. Boone notices a shard in Locke's leg but Locke says he feels no pain and that night he discovers he is losing the feeling in his legs.

Meanwhile, James "Sawyer" Ford (Josh Holloway) is suffering from headaches and a sensitivity – Jack Shephard (Matthew Fox) diagnoses this as farsightedness caused by the strain placed on Sawyer's eyes due to his large amount of reading since arriving on the island. Using spare glasses found from the wreckage and Sayid Jarrah's (Naveen Andrews) engineering skills, Jack offers Sawyer a new pair of glasses to read with.

Locke and Boone are at the hatch again, and while Locke is undeterred Boone is becoming fatalistic and believes their continued efforts to open it a waste of time. Locke asserts that the island will send them a sign about the hatch. Then Locke sees a Beechcraft 18 that crashed in the jungle, then sees his mother, himself on a wheelchair, and blood-covered Boone  uttering the phrase "Theresa falls up the stairs, Theresa falls down the stairs.", which is revealed to be a dream. Locke awakens and wakes up Boone to head out in search of the aircraft, but Locke has suddenly found himself losing the use of his legs as he can no longer stably walk. During the walk, they discover a decayed body in a Catholic priest's clothing, carrying Nigerian currency and an unloaded handgun. When Locke falls, Boone tries to convince him to return to camp, but Locke convinces him to continue by mentioning the phrase he heard Boone say in his dream. Boone reveals that Theresa was his nanny when he was a child who broke her neck on the stairs one day; at this point, the two spot the plane in a tree.

Because Locke is unable to walk, Boone must climb the tree to search the plane alone. He discovers a trove of statues of the Virgin Mary filled with heroin, the decayed body of another man dressed as a priest, and a working radio. Boone sends out a distress call on the radio and a male voice answers, "Is someone out there?" to which Boone responds, "We are the survivors of the crash of Oceanic Flight 8-1-5." The voice answers "WE'RE the survivors of Oceanic Flight 815." At this point the teetering plane shifts from Boone's movements and suddenly falls to the ground, crashing nose first. Frantically, Locke struggles to his feet, hoists a critically injured Boone on his shoulders, and returns to the camp.

Locke carries Boone to the cave and lies to Jack, telling him that Boone fell from a cliff while they were hunting. Jack begins treating Boone, and Locke disappears into the jungle to return to the hatch. Locke pounds on the door and screams in anguish at how he has done everything the island has asked him to do, and how he is both losing his ability to walk and unable to open the door. Suddenly the hatch window is illuminated.

Production
This was the first episode to be written by both creator Damon Lindelof and "Hearts and Minds" writer Carlton Cuse.

Reception
17.75 million American viewers tuned in to this episode.

References

External links

"Deus Ex Machina" at ABC

Lost (season 1) episodes
2005 American television episodes
Television episodes written by Damon Lindelof